The Dubai Golden Shaheen is a Group 1 flat horse race in the United Arab Emirates for three-year-old and above thoroughbreds run over a distance of 1,200 metres (approximately 6 furlongs) on the dirt course at Meydan Racecourse in Dubai in late March.

It was first run in December 1993 as the Nad Al Sheba Sprint, and its place in the calendar was moved in 1996 to be included in the Dubai World Cup Night held annually in March. The race took its present name in 2000 and it attained Group 1 status in 2002. Prior to 2010 it was run at Nad Al Sheba Racecourse. From 2012, Dubai Golden Shaheen joined Global Sprint Challenge and represents the third leg of the ten-race series.

The Dubai Golden Shaheen currently offers a purse of US$2 million.

Records
Speed record: 
 1:08.10 - Big Jag (2000) (at Nad al Sheba)
 1:09.01 - Zenden (2021) (at Meydan)

Most wins:
 2 - Caller One (2001, 2002)
 2 - Mind Your Biscuits (2017, 2018)

Most wins by a jockey:
 2 - Gary Stevens (1999, 2002)
 2 - Alex Solis (2000, 2004)
 2 - Joel Rosario (2017, 2018)
Most wins by a trainer:
 2 - Dhruba Selvaratnam (1998, 1999)
 2 - James Chapman (2001, 2002)
 2 - Chad Summers (2017, 2018)

Most wins by an owner:
 2 - Carolyn Chapman & Theresa McArthur (2001, 2002)
 2 - J Stables, Head Of Plains Partners LLC Et Al (2017, 2018)

Winners

See also
 List of United Arab Emirates horse races

References
Racing Post:

Open sprint category horse races
Horse races in the United Arab Emirates
Recurring sporting events established in 1996
Nad Al Sheba Racecourse
1996 establishments in the United Arab Emirates